Win "Winfred" Ng (April 13, 1936 – September 6, 1991) was a Chinese American artist, entrepreneur, and decorative designer. Ng was known for working as a ceramist, sculptor, metal worker, industrial designer, painter and illustrator, but best known as the co-founder of the groundbreaking San Francisco based department store Taylor & Ng and his commercial ceramics work under the same name.

His artwork is in the collections of the Smithsonian, the National Museum of Modern Art, Tokyo, Victoria & Albert Museum, Museum of Contemporary Crafts, San Francisco Museum of Modern Art, Museum of Art and Design (MAD) and the De Young Museum.

Early life
Ng was born in Chinatown, San Francisco to Chinese immigrants, Fook On Ng and Kow Yuan Ng. As a teenager he worked under ceramic artist and author, Jade Snow Wong.

He studied at Saint Mary's Academy, City College of San Francisco, and San Francisco State University. After serving in the United States Army he studied at the San Francisco Art Institute receiving a Bachelor of Fine Arts degree in 1959. He began the Masters of Fine Arts program at Mills College in 1960 but did not complete the program.

His early career as a ceramicist focused on abstract work influenced by Peter Voulkos and resulted in a one-man show in 1958 at the Michow Gallery in New York City. From 1958 to 1965, Ng worked as a gallery artist, producing abstract ceramics sculptures. By the 1970s Ng had seven one-man shows to his credit in Paris, New York, Portland, Oregon, and San Francisco.

Taylor & Ng

Ng met artist Spaulding Taylor and shifted his focus toward utilitarian and functional illustration and design work. In 1965 the two founded Environmental Ceramics (the precursor to Taylor & Ng) and moved into creating handmade art-ware and homewares.

Taylor & Ng was founded during 1965 and, with the addition of Win Ng's brother, Norman Ng, as president, grew from a small ceramics shop on Howard Street (in San Francisco) into a major producer and retailer of housewares and owning a multi-level emporium shop at Embarcadero Center. There were also stores at other Bay Area locations as well a Taylor & Ng shop inside Macy’s in New York.  These products sold heavily through Macy's and other major department stores and housewares retailers throughout the US during the late 1970s and 1980s.

Win Ng's whimsical designs and animal drawings became a thematic focal point for many extremely popular Taylor & Ng products, from coffee mugs to kitchen aprons, pot holders, and dishtowels. Ng created pottery, book designs, and linens for over 20 years.

Through their own San Francisco department store and wholesale business, Taylor & Ng not only created a signature style still in demand by collectors, but helped to popularize Asian culture and cuisine.  The Taylor & Ng company is credited with bringing the Chinese wok to the US and making it a common kitchen utensil. In the late 1970s, they expanded their line to include a wide range of kitchen products, including a clever wood-and-metal-hook pot rack called the "Track Rack" that is still sold today. In 1977, Taylor & Ng introduced one of the first knock-down furniture products, the award-winning "Chair-In-A-Box," designed by Don Vandervort (who later went on to found HomeTips.com). The Taylor & Ng department store closed in 1985 so that the business could focus on its wholesale activities.

Late life 
Ng was openly gay. His life partner was Spaulding Taylor, artist and co-founder of Taylor & Ng.

In 1981, Ng left the retail design world to focus on his gallery work.

Ng died on September 6, 1991, from AIDS-related complications. He was 55. Ng's was represented posthumously by the Braunstein/Quay Gallery in San Francisco until the gallery closed in 2011.

Legacy
Ng's 1968 colorful, ceramic tile mural illustrating science is located at the Maxine Hall Health Center in the Western Addition neighborhood of San Francisco. This mural was produced by the San Francisco Art Commission. A 1970s mural, 100 by 16 foot by Ng graces the concourse level of the Orinda BART station in Contra Costa County, California.

In April 2005, the Chinese Historical Society of America in collaboration with the Queer Cultural Center held a retrospective of Ng's work under the title of "The Art of Win Ng" as part of the National Queer Arts Festival 2005.

Bibliography 
Ng created illustrations for a number of books by Yerba Buena Press throughout the 1970s.  These included collaborations with authors Violet and Charles Schafer.  Ng also illustrated publications by Taylor & Ng.

References

External links
San Francisco Art Institute Win Ng page
Chinese Historical Society of America page on Ng Retrospective
Queer Cultural Center press release on Win Ng Retrospective
Taylor & Ng online retailer homepage

1936 births
1991 deaths
American illustrators
American artists of Chinese descent
American gay artists
San Francisco Art Institute alumni
Artists from San Francisco
AIDS-related deaths in California
American industrial designers
20th-century American sculptors
American male sculptors
American LGBT sculptors
American LGBT people of Asian descent
City College of San Francisco alumni
San Francisco State University alumni
Gay sculptors
Mills College alumni
American ceramists
Sculptors from California
20th-century ceramists
20th-century American LGBT people
20th-century American male artists